SMIM19, also known as Small Integral Membrane Protein 19, encodes the SMIM19 protein. SMIM19 is a confirmed single-pass transmembrane protein passing from outside to inside, 5' to 3' respectively. SMIM19 has ubiquitously high to medium expression with among varied tissues or organs. The validated function of SMIM19 remains under review because of on sub-cellular localization uncertainty. However, all linked proteins research to interact with SMIM19 are associated with the endoplasmic reticulum (ER), presuming SMIM19 ER association

Gene 
SMIM19 is also commonly known and referenced as C8orf40 (chromosome 8 open reading frame 40). SMIM19 also has a few other lesser known names, such as LOC114926, Doyzeeby, and Beeveybu. The SMIM19 gene is located on the plus strand at 8p11.21 in humans. The SMIM19 gene is composed of 4 total exons and spanning 14.04 kb from 42,541,155 bp to 42,555,193 bp. The upstream neighboring gene to SMIM19 is SLC20A2.

Transcripts

Variants 
There are four validate transcript variants for SMIM19 that all encode the same protein, as they only differ in sequence within the 5' UTR. Transcript variant 1 represents the longest transcript

Features 
The SMIM19 mRNA is composed of one major polyadenylation sequence and site combination and three alternative ones, along with an upstream in-frame stop codon. Not all variants contain the upstream in-frame stop codon as it is present in the portion of the 5' UTR that varies. The polyadenylation sequences and site are consistent among all transcript variants.

Protein

Isoforms 
There is only one validated SMIM19 protein isoform that is encoded by all four transcript variants. It is 107 amino acids long with a molecular weight of 12.44 kDa. The isoelectric point varies among SMIM19 organism and shows a pattern based on taxonomical group, likely due to post-modification variations between taxonomical group

Amino Acid Composition 
The SMIM19 protein contains a validated transmembrane region. There is no indication that SMIM19 is rich or poor in any amino acid; no amino acid or combination of amino acids were outside of the standard deviation in relation to abundance. There was no significance detected with the spacing of cysteines as SMIM19 contains none. Similarly, there were no repetitive structures i.e., separated, tandem or periodic repeats, found in SMIM19 protein sequence

Transmembrane/ Hydrophobic Region 
The SMIM19 protein contains a transmembrane region, which is also considered a hydrophobic region that spans 19 amino acids. The right a TMpred output predicted orientation analysis of the SMIM19 protein demonstrates that the protein is likely oriented outside to inside, which was used to structure the TOPO2 diagram.

Positive Amino Acid Run 
Consistent with the majority of SMIM19 homologs, there is a positive amino acid run almost immediately following the transmembrane region: KRR (Lysine, Arginine, Arginine).

Motifs 
There were four matches for motifs with the SMIM19 sequence that are predicted to be significant. Casein kinase 2 can play a role in cell cycle regulation, DNA repair, and necessary for cell survival; down-regulation of Casein kinase 2 can promote tumorigenesis. Protein kinase C is a protein-regulator and is highly involved in various signaling cascades. Dendritic Cells- Specific Transmembrane Protein (DC-STAMP) is a seven- pass transmembrane protein specifically found in dendritic cells, often associated with immunological functions. Based on Eukaryotic Linear Motif predictions, there are strong sequence matches for cleavage site motifs following the transmembrane region, which also remain consistent among orthologs

Secondary Structure 

Based on ALI2D and Phyr2 (diagram pictured) data, it is determined that an alpha helix is likely present at the beginning of the sequence right before the transmembrane sequence with high confidence analysis. The transmembrane region structure following this first alpha helix, varies in structure per program used for analysis, so no conclusions could be made. The second beta sheet is consistent amongst various programs, and is likely a strong candidate for prediction. Following this, the large alpha helix predicted remains fairly consistent through all orthologs with high confidence from both Pyre2 and ALI2D. The end beta sheet is consistent between program analyses and predictions but remains in low confidence, so no definitive conclusions could be made.

Tertiary Structure 
 
I-Tasser results of both the SMIM19 upstream and down stream sequence to the transmembrane domain (pictured left and right respectively) were analyzed with iCn3D. The SMIM19 protein is analyzed as a whole cause the cytosolic and extracellular sequence flanking the transmembrane domain attempt to coil together, producing a false predicted 3D structure as they should never interact being there is a membrane between them. Therefore, each upstream and downstream sequences was analyzed separately. Within each diagram there is a yellow highlighted section where the transmembrane sequence would meet each respective sequence. No strong conclusions can be made about SMIM19 tertiary structure beyond a large alpha helix present in the downstream sequence to the transmembrane region, consistent with Ali2D and Phyr2 results above

Regulation and Expression

Gene-level Regulation

Promoter 
The most conserved promoter among SMIM19 orthologs was GXP_9002686 on the positive strand spanning 1962 bp, located between 42,540,128 and 42,542,089. It is also supported by the greatest number of transcripts.

Transcription factors 
The below selected transcription factors were chosen based on conservation among species first, and then further parsed for high matrix similarity and high number of proposed binding sites with in an extended SMIM19 promoter region. Conservation was highest further that desired from transcription start site.

Expression Patterns 
According to RNA-seq data from Human Protein Atlas, SMIM19 has ubiquitously medium to high expression in all tissues with low specificity. Comparatively, there is higher expression in liver, muscle, some glandular tissue, and various immune cells. Expression in the brain is comparatively consistently lower.Chromatin Immunoprecipitation (ChIP) data for SMIM19 in mice even more confidently display ubiquitously medium to high expression in tissue; No tissue seems to fall below the 50 percentile rank for expression. Muscle tissue has high expression in mice as well. Adipose tissue and diaphragm tissue uniquely are high in expression comparatively.

in situ hybridization data of SMIM19 expression in sagittal sectioning of whole embryos produced no definitive conclusions. No significantly abnormal cellular expression were observed.  SMIM19 appears to be uniformly expressed.

Transcript-level Regulation

miRNA binding sites 
Hsa-miR-1206 and hsa-miR-433-3p were both highly ranked microRNAs in reference to predicted sequence matching with SMIM19 transcript. Each position and predicted sequence pairing is displayed in the image below.

mRNA-binding proteins 
The tables below represent the most significant RNA-binding proteins based on relevancy and match score to the SMIM19 5’ UTR and 3’ UTR. Selection was not based on conserved sequence observed between orthologs being there is little conservation of the SMIM19 5’ and 3’ UTR outside of mammals.

Secondary structure 

Large variation in SMIM19 5' UTR between variants within Homo sapiens and orthologs, makes secondary structure of possible regulation site fairly unreliable.

Relatively consistent 3' UTR produced one conserved stem-loop structure (pictured on right). With such a long SMIM19 3' UTR, a predicted secondary structure is improbable.

Protein-level Regulation

Sub-cellular Localization 
There is much uncertainty in the SMIM19 sub-cellular localization.

Analyzed as a whole protein, SMIM19 is predicted as type 1b for membrane topology meaning it does not have a cleavable signal sequence but does have a transmembrane segment but not located near the C-terminus. Type 1b proteins favor localization at the ER. With high discrepancy of the localization of SMIM19 between nuclear or cytoplasmic, the Homo sapiens protein with majority ortholog confirmation is predicted to be a cytoplasmic protein.

Being there may be a cleavage site and signal sequence after the transmembrane sequence, SMIM19 analysis of the C-terminus and N-terminus separately produced varying results. The N-terminus is suggested to be located within the cytoplasm and have the same membrane topology as described above. The C-terminus is shown to have a mitochondrial targeting sequence and predicted to localize at the mitochondria

Post-translational Modifications 
High scoring values with low p-values provide confidence in the prediction of interactions to both the phosphorylation site and SUMO Interaction site with SMIM19. A SUMO interaction matched with a short sequence within the SMIM19 transmembrane region, likely meaning it is involved in the degradation process of the protein as that would likely be the only time SMIM19 is removed from the membrane resulting in the sit being exposed.

With high confidence via Myristolator, it is predicted that SMIM19 is created and cut to reveal the 4th glycine as the n-terminal glycine. This was determined with a 24 positive to 1 negative average response to neural networks with a confidence level of 0.855 where high is greater than 0.85 and less than 1. As the first three glycine predicted non-myristylation 0:25, positive: negative respectfully. This adds to the conclusion that SMIM19 protein is membrane associated.

Homology and Evolution

Paralogs 
There are no paralogs of SMIM19 currently present in the human genome.

Orthologs 
The oldest known ancestors of SMIM19 are invertebrates; invertebrates are the most distant homologs of SMIM19 detectable. No homologs of SMIM19 were evolutionarily found past Invertebrates; the gene is not found in plants, bacteria, etc. The gene is also not present in the Insecta class, within the invertebrates.

Evolutionary context

Unrooted Phylogenetic Tree

Rate of Evolution 
SMIM19 has a comparatively fast evolution rate, estimated to be about 7 amino acid changes per 100 residues per one million years.

Interacting Proteins

Function and Clinical Significance 
Although the function of SMIM19 is relatively unclear, there are many links of SMIM19 to a large deletion, up to 9 genes sequentially in chromosome 8, including a seemingly important neighboring gene, SLC20A2, and including SMIM19 to basal ganglia calcification. Genes in this cytogenetic region, including SMIM19 gene, are also prone to down regulation in common breast tumors and cell lines pertaining to breast cancer. There is also evidence of SMIM19 becoming hypomethylated in hepatocellular carcinoma cells that were enriched with cancer stem cells

Mutations 
The SNP results below are based on the output of accession NM_001135674.1 analysis on dbSNP Short Genetic Variation and were selected based on their location in significant portions of the SMIM19 protein. All SNPs chosen are located within the coding sequence. No SNPs were found within the 5’ UTR or 3’ UTR significant portions such as microRNA, so the focus was on the coding sequence. SNPs 1-15 were found as variations of the most conserved amino acids among all orthologs. SNPs 16-2 are found in the transmembrane region of SMIM19.

References